The 2019–20 Liga Leumit will be the 21st season as second tier since its re-alignment in 1999 and the 78th season of second-tier football in Israel.

A total of sixteen teams will be contesting in the league, including twelve sides from the 2018–19 season, the two promoted teams from 2018–19 Liga Alef and the two relegated teams from 2018–19 Israeli Premier League.

Changes from 2018–19 season

Team changes
Hapoel Kfar Saba and Sektzia Nes Tziona were promoted to the 2019–20 Israeli Premier League.

Maccabi Petah Tikva and Bnei Sakhnin were relegated after finishing as the two bottom-placed clubs in the 2018–19 Israeli Premier League.

Hapoel Marmorek, and Hapoel Iksal were directly relegated to Liga Alef after finishing in the previous season in last two league places. They were replaced by the top placed teams from each division of 2018–19 Liga Alef, F.C. Kafr Qasim (from South Division) and Hapoel Umm al-Fahm (from North Division).

Overview

Stadia and locations

The club is playing their home games at a neutral venue because their own ground does not meet league requirements.

Regular season

Results

Results by round

Position by round

Promotion playoffs

Relegation playoffs

Relegation decider

Promotion/relegation playoff
The winner of the Relegation decider game , Hapoel Afula, faced Liga Alef promotion play-offs winner Hapoel Marmorek . The match took place on 2 August 2020.

See also
 2019–20 Toto Cup Leumit

References

2019–20 in Israeli football leagues
Liga Leumit seasons
Isr